Simikot Airport  is a domestic airport located in Simikot  serving Humla District, a district in Karnali Province in Nepal. It is the main tourist gateway on the Nepalese side to the Mount Kailash and Lake Manasarovar. As road access in this area of Nepal is weak, the airport facilitates travel in the whole district of Humla.

Facilities
The runway has recently been improved and extended with more infrastructure being built.

As a result of this construction the parking facilities and terminals also have seen some improvement. Pilgrims and Trekkers bound for Lake Manasarovar and Mount Kailash in China's Tibet Autonomous Region fly into Simikot and proceed to the international border at Hilsa on foot 
or by helicopter.

Airlines and destinations

Accidents and incidents
On 23 June 2011, Tara Air Dornier 228 9N-AGQ was substantially damaged in a heavy landing and runway excursion. The aircraft was operating a cargo flight from Nepalgunj Airport.

References

External links

 

Airports in Nepal
Buildings and structures in Humla District